Qalacıq (also, Kaladzhik and Kaladzhyk) is a village and municipality in the Ismailli Rayon of Azerbaijan.  It has a population of 1,752.

References 

Populated places in Ismayilli District